Dr Samuel Henry Kellogg (1839–1899) was an American Presbyterian missionary in India who played the major role in revising and retranslating the Hindi Bible. His colleagues in the translation were William Hooper and Joseph Arthur Lambert.

Kellogg was one of the leading advocates of the change in American Evangelical theology from postmillennialism to premillennialism between 1870 and 1910. He also wrote a treatise on Hindi grammar, HINDI VYAKARAN, published by Hindi Sahitya Sammelan, Prayag (Allahabad).

References

Translators of the Bible into Hindi
American Presbyterians
1899 deaths
1839 births
19th-century translators